Hatyaraala is a village in Kadapa district of the Indian state of Andhra Pradesh.

References 

Villages in Kadapa district